Patrick Orphé Mbina (born 2 November 2000) is a Gabonese professional footballer who plays as a forward for the French club Chamalières.

Career
On 21 August 2020, Mbina signed a contract with Grenoble Foot 38. Mbina made his senior debut with Grenoble in a 1–0 Ligue 2 loss to Amiens SC on 17 October 2020.

On 22 July 2021, he moved to Beauvais. He moved on to Chamalières on 28 June 2022.

References

External links
 

2000 births
Living people
Sportspeople from Libreville
Gabonese footballers
AS Béziers (2007) players
Grenoble Foot 38 players
AS Beauvais Oise players
FC Chamalières players
Ligue 2 players
Championnat National players
Championnat National 2 players
Championnat National 3 players
Association football forwards
Gabonese expatriate footballers
Gabonese expatriate sportspeople in France
Expatriate footballers in France
21st-century Gabonese people